Igor Sergeyevich Ivanov (born 23 September 1945) is a Russian politician who was Foreign Minister of Russia from 1998 to 2004 under both the Yeltsin and the Putin administrations.

Early life 
Ivanov was born in 1945 in Moscow to a Russian father and a Georgian mother (Elena Sagirashvili). In 1969 he graduated at the Maurice Thorez Moscow Institute of Foreign Languages (Moscow State Linguistic University). He joined the Soviet Foreign Ministry in 1973 and spent a decade in Spain. He returned to the Soviet Union in 1983. In 1991 he became the ambassador in Madrid.

Minister of Foreign Affairs
He was appointed Minister of Foreign Affairs on September 11, 1998. As Russian foreign minister, Ivanov was an opponent of NATO's action in Yugoslavia. He was also an opponent of the U.S. invasion of Iraq. Ivanov played a key role in mediating a deal between Georgian President Eduard Shevardnadze and opposition parties during Georgia's "Rose Revolution" in 2003.

Later career
Ivanov was succeeded by Sergey Lavrov as foreign minister in 2004, and appointed by President Vladimir Putin to the post of Secretary of the Russian Security Council. On 9 July 2007, he submitted his resignation, which was accepted by President Putin on 18 July.

Ivanov is the president of the Russian International Affairs Council (RIAC), and is a professor at the Moscow State Institute of International Relations (MGIMO-University), a member of the Supervisory Council of the International Luxembourg Forum on Preventing Nuclear Catastrophe, and a member of the European Council on Tolerance and Reconciliation.

In 2011, Ivanov became a member of the Advisory Council of The Hague Institute for Global Justice, and in 2014 worked for The Moscow Times.

Honours and awards
Hero of the Russian Federation (27 October 1999)
Order of Merit for the Fatherland, 2nd (1999) and 4th (1996) classes
Order of the Badge of Honour (1988)
Medal "In Commemoration of the 850th Anniversary of Moscow"
Honoured Worker of the Diplomatic Service of the Russian Federation (2003)
Gratitude of the President of the Russian Federation (1995, 1996, 1997, 1998, 1999)
Grand Cross of the Order of San Carlos (2001, Colombia)
Order of Friendship (Vietnam) (2001)
Order of Saint Blessed Prince Vladimir, 2nd class (2003, Russian Orthodox Church)
Commemorative Medal Gorchakov (2005, Russian MFA)
"Silver Cross" of the Russian Biographical Institute (1999)
Laureate of the "Man of the Year" (1999)

References

External links

Personal data sheet: Igor Ivanov
"Igor Ivanov", TIME magazine, 13 September 1999;
Bridget Kendall interview with Ivanov, BBC, 5 March 2003
Igor Ivanov: cheery and direct, BBC NEWS
Igor Ivanov

1945 births
Living people
Moscow State Linguistic University alumni
Diplomats from Moscow
Soviet diplomats
Ambassador Extraordinary and Plenipotentiary (Soviet Union)
Foreign ministers of Russia
Politicians from Moscow
People of the Chechen wars
Recipients of the Order "For Merit to the Fatherland", 2nd class
Heroes of the Russian Federation
Recipients of the Friendship Order
2003 Tuzla Island conflict
The Moscow Times